The ordinary snake eel (Myrophis microchir) is an eel in the family Ophichthidae (worm/snake eels). It was described by Pieter Bleeker in 1864, originally under the genus Echelus. It is a marine, tropical eel which is known from the Indo-Western Pacific, including Vietnam, Japan, Fiji, the Marshall Islands, and Australia. It inhabits sandy sediments.

References

Fish described in 1864
Myrophis